The Italian Union of Clothing Workers (UILA) was a trade union representing workers in the garment industry in Italy.

The union was founded in 1953, although it did not hold its first conference until 1958.  It affiliated to the Italian Union of Labour.  By 1965, the union had 44,278 members.  In 1969, it merged with the Italian Union of Textile Workers, to form the Italian Union of Textile and Clothing Workers.

References

Clothing industry trade unions
Trade unions in Italy
Trade unions established in 1953
Trade unions disestablished in 1969
Clothing